General elections were held in Cambodia on 9 September 1951. The Democratic Party won 54 of the 78 seats.

Results

References

Cambodia
Elections in Cambodia
1951 in Cambodia
Election and referendum articles with incomplete results